is a live album by Japanese novelty heavy metal band Animetal, released through VAP on June 23, 2004. The album features "The Animetal", a re-recording of the band's self-titled 1996 debut single.

Track listing
All tracks are arranged by Animetal.

Personnel 
 – Lead vocals
Syu – Guitar
Masaki – Bass

References

External links 

2004 live albums
Animetal albums
Japanese-language live albums